Group B of the 2004 Fed Cup Americas Zone Group I was one of two pools in the Americas Zone Group I of the 2004 Fed Cup. Four teams competed in a round robin competition, with the top two teams and the bottom two teams proceeding to their respective sections of the play-offs: the top teams play for advancement to the World Group Play-offs, while the bottom teams face potential relegation to Group II.

Canada vs. Cuba

Uruguay vs. Chile

Brazil vs. Uruguay

Chile vs. Cuba

Canada vs. Uruguay

Brazil vs. Chile

Canada vs. Brazil

Uruguay vs. Cuba

Canada vs. Chile

Brazil vs. Cuba

See also
Fed Cup structure

References

External links
 Fed Cup website

2004 Fed Cup Americas Zone